Killarney is a suburb of Johannesburg, South Africa. A relatively wealthy area, located west of the M1 freeway, Killarney is a densely built-up area, and it has numerous apartment blocks, as well as a large shopping mall, Killarney Mall.

Neighbouring suburbs include Houghton Estate, Riviera, and Parktown.

It is home to the first shopping mall in Johannesburg. It was formerly known as the Hollywood of Johannesburg, due it being the location of one of the first film studios in South Africa. Killarney currently is home to consulates, tall residential building (including some of Johannesburg's best examples of Art Deco architecture) and a golf course. There is a large Jewish and Muslim community in Killarney. Killarney is very cosmopolitan and also has a large gay community.

History 

In the early 1930s, the land in Killarney, an outlying northern suburb, belonged to I.W. Schlesinger’s African Realty Trust. ‘The Uncrowned King of Africa’ had bought the 43-hectare for £120,000. According to his plan, the majority of the sites were not to be built up. They were to remain a park area. Still, he demarcated a few areas for buildings.

US-born Schlesinger wanted to transplant American ways to South African soil, and particularly to his domain, Killarney. On the grounds currently occupied by the mall, he built African Film Studios, Johannesburg’s answer to Hollywood. This man, one of the richest in the country, preferred to live in a flat, New York-style. This might explain his decision to sell sites in the suburb for development of modern apartment blocks.

Daventry Court was probably the first multi-storied block of flats erected in Killarney in the 1930s.

In its adverts, African Realty Trust used to describe Killarney as ‘a garden, an orchard, a vineyard, an orangery, a shrubbery, a pinery, a paradise, a picnic spot, a health resort, a township and a home’. Schlesinger, who lived in Whitehall Court, wanted to preserve this character of the suburb and was very particular about tidiness. If the construction workers accidentally spilt sand or some rubble over the sites’ boundaries, he immediately received a letter from Schlesinger’s office: ‘Please, keep Killarney clean!’

The area attracted many Jews. I W Schlesinger, the initial developer, was always open about his Jewish identity. He set up several facilities in Killarney that welcomed his co-religionists: the Transvaal Automobile Club or the Killarney Golf Course. There were quite a few Jewish tenants in Daventry Court from the very beginning.

By the 1960-70s, the status of Killarney had changed. It was no longer an area of choice for the forward-looking people. The average tenants were middle-aged or even elderly.

Fay Susser-Sher remarks in her thesis on Killarney: ‘Often after having brought up children on large plots in the very affluent suburb of Lower Houghton, the parents, after the children had left home, sold the houses and then moved into flats in Killarney.’

Many of them settled there for life. A very prominent section consisted of affluent Jews, members of the Oxford Shul congregation, attended by Black domestic servants who lived in the outbuildings next to the block.

According to the 1985 census about half of the suburb’s White population were older than sixty-five.

These days, Killarney is no longer the sparsely populated suburb it was at the inception of Daventry Court. There are almost sixty apartment blocks here, of which Whitehall Court and our building are the oldest.

Killarney has become more cosmopolitan. Though Pick ‘n Pay at the mall still has a large kosher department, the suburb has lost its predominantly Jewish character. Gone are the well-to-do ‘blue-rinsed grannies of Killarney’. Since the early 1990s, the area has attracted the new multiracial middle-class, younger upward-mobile people.

What’s more, occupancy and ownership have become more fluid. Nowadays there are only several people in the building who have resided here for more than fifteen years.

References

External links

Shopping
Killarney Mall

Johannesburg Region E